Sergio de Lis de Andrés (born 19 May 1986 in San Sebastián, Basque Country) is a Spanish former professional road bicycle racer who rode for two seasons for UCI ProTour team . He retired at the age of 24, citing family reasons.

References

External links 
Profile on team website

1986 births
Living people
Cyclists from the Basque Country (autonomous community)
Spanish male cyclists
Sportspeople from San Sebastián